In Greek mythology, Copreus (Ancient Greek: Κοπρεύς, Kopreús) was King Eurystheus' herald who announced Heracles' Twelve Labors.

Etymology 
His name is usually translated as "dung man", or something equally unflattering. However, the name "Copreus" may originally have had more positive connotations, meaning "grazier" or "man of the land", and been associated with the ownership of cattle rather than just their dung (κόπρος).

Mythology 
Copreus was said to be a son of Pelops and Hippodameia. He was a fugitive from Elis where he had killed a man called Iphitus, but Eurystheus purified him of the murder. Copreus had a son named Periphetes, who features briefly in the Iliad as a well-loved warrior speared by Hector. By contrast, Copreus is disparaged by Homer:
{|
|
 So of a sire much baser an excellent son was begotten
 better in prowess of every sort, on his feet and in battle|}

 Notes 

 References 
 Homer, The Iliad with an English Translation by A.T. Murray, Ph.D. in two volumes. Cambridge, MA., Harvard University Press; London, William Heinemann, Ltd. 1924. Online version at the Perseus Digital Library.
 Homer, Homeri Opera in five volumes. Oxford, Oxford University Press. 1920. Greek text available at the Perseus Digital Library.
 Pseudo-Apollodorus, The Library'' with an English Translation by Sir James George Frazer, F.B.A., F.R.S. in 2 Volumes, Cambridge, MA, Harvard University Press; London, William Heinemann Ltd. 1921. Online version at the Perseus Digital Library. Greek text available from the same website.

Characters in Greek mythology